Tillandsia kessleri is a species of flowering plant in the genus Tillandsia. This species is endemic to Bolivia.

References 

kessleri
Flora of Bolivia